Bunya may refer to:


Places 
 Bunya, Queensland, Australia, a locality in the Moreton Bay Region
 Bunya Mountains, a mountain range in Queensland, Australia
 Bunya, Namibia, a village
 Bunya, the Hungarian name for the Romanian village of Bunea Mare, Făget
 Chiefdom of Bunya, a chiefdom of the kingdom of Busoga in Uganda

People 
 Fun'ya no Asayasu or Bunya no Asayusa, 9th and 10th century Japanese poet
 Chiang Wen-yeh (1910–1983), known as Koh Bunya in the West, Taiwanese composer
 Lydie Dooh Bunya (born 1933), Paris-based Cameroonian journalist, writer and feminist

Other uses 
 Bunya Highway, a state highway of Queensland, Australia

 Bunya Productions, an Australian film production company

See also
 Bunya pine or Araucaria bidwillii, a native Australian tree
 Bunya sunskink or Lampropholis colossus, a species of Australian skunk
 The Bunyas, a heritage-listed residence and former church missionary and scout headquarters in Sydney, New South Wales, Australia
 Bunia, the capital city of Ituri Province in the Democratic Republic of the Congo
 Boondi, an Indian dessert called Buniya in Nepali